Austal USA is an American shipbuilder based on Blakeley Island in Mobile, Alabama. It is a subsidiary of the Australian shipbuilder Austal, operating under a Special Security Arrangement which allows it to work independently and separately on some of the most sensitive United States defense programs despite its foreign ownership.

Austal USA was formed in 1999 when Austal formed a 70:30 joint venture with Bender Shipbuilding & Repair Co to build ferries. Austal bought out its partner in September 2006.

Notable projects for the shipbuilder include the United States Navy's Independence class littoral combat ship (first launched in 2008) and United States Coast Guard's Heritage-class cutter (contract awarded in 2022).

Projects
Austal USA's first contract was for two crew supply vessels for service in the Gulf of Mexico. These were followed by a ferry for Lighthouse Fast Ferry of New York.

Austal USA built the Lake Express for service across Lake Michigan, and the Alakai for  Hawaii Superferry. Huakai, the second high-speed vehicle-passenger catamaran for Hawaii Superferry has been launched at Austal USA. The National Geographic Channel series MegaStructures featured an episode in September 2007 that detailed the construction, launch, and sea trials of the Alakai, the first catamaran Hawaii Superferry.

Austal USA is also currently constructing the Independence class of littoral combat ships for the United States Navy, based on a  advanced trimaran seaframe. In March 2015, Navy Secretary Ray Mabus testified before Congress that the Navy intends to purchase a total of 52 the vessels. The final 20 will be upgraded with new capabilities. The cost of each ship is about $350 million.

It was announced in November 2008 that Austal USA had won a United States Navy contract to build ten Spearhead-class expeditionary fast transport ships. The design, with a catamaran seaframe, was drawn from the Austal-built MV Westpac Express. Unlike the Littoral Combat Ship, the Joint High Speed Vessel is for transport, not combat.

On July 22, 2010, Austal USA hosted a keel-laying ceremony at its shipyard to signify the erection of the first modules on USAV Spearhead (JHSV 1), lead ship in the 10-ship Joint High Speed Vessel (JHSV) program, The JHSV program has a potential worth of over $1.6 billion for the company.  On December 27, 2012, the navy awarded its final option under its current contract, and ordered JHSV-10.

Austal USA also signed a contract for 10 Joint High Speed Vessels (JHSVs). One of them, the Trenton (JHSV 5) completed acceptance trials March 13 and was delivered on April 13, 2015 to the Navy's Military Sealift Command.

On May 5, 2016, Austal USA has been awarded a $18.5 million contract from the Navy for the 12th Expeditionary Fast Transport (EPF) vessel.

The United States Coast Guard awarded Austal USA a contract on June 30, 2022 to build up to 11 Offshore Patrol Cutters under Phase 2 of the program with a potential total combined price of $3.3 billion if all 11 ships are ordered.

Legal

Unionizing efforts
Following complaints from the Sheet Metal Workers' International Association (SMWIA), Austal USA has twice been found to have engaged in unfair labor practices with respect to the organizing effort of unions by the National Labor Relations Board. Unionization had been rejected by employees in elections held in May 2002 and April 2008.  A third attempt in August 2011 was again rejected with a vote of 613 against unionization to 367 for it. The SMWIA filed a new complaint with the labor board after the result.

Discrimination allegations
In March 2008, the company was sued by 22 employees for alleged racial discrimination and a hostile work environment.  The company was found not guilty in separate discrimination trials that culminated in October 2011 and January 2012. A request for a new discrimination trial was rejected in March 2012 by a federal court. After appeals, seven of the plaintiffs were allowed to proceed to trial. Juries found in favor of Austal USA in April 2015.

References

External links
Company website

Companies based in Mobile, Alabama
Defense companies of the United States
Shipbuilding companies of the United States
Vehicle manufacturing companies established in 1999
1999 establishments in Alabama